Saurauia is a genus of plants in the family Actinidiaceae. It comprises about over 300 species distributed in the tropics and subtropics of Asia and South and Central America. Genetic evidence and the cell biology of the group support monophyly of the genus. Monophyly of the genus is also supported by micromorphological characters and by phylogenetic analysis, although the exact evolutionary relationships of Saurauia with the other two genera of the Actinidiaceae, Actinidia and Clematoclethra, are not well understood. It is also the only extant genus within its family whose natural distribution includes areas outside of Asia (tropical South and Central America).

Description
The floral characteristics of Saurauia are similar to those in the other members of the Actinidiaceae. The main floral differences between Saurauia and the other members are that the species of Saurauia have 3-5 carpels while Actinidia has 3-30 or more and Clematoclethra has 4 or 5. Also, Saurauia is the only genus in the Actinidiaceae whose members may be monoecious or functionally dioecious.

Fossil record
The oldest fossil records of Saurauia include characteristic seed synapomorphies of the genus that are from the late Turonian (about 89 Ma) of Central Europe. Two extinct species were established, †Saurauia alenae and †Saurauia antique, both are recorded from several assemblages in Central Europe and ranging in age from the late Turonian to the Maastrichtian.

Species

Species include:

References

 
Ericales genera
Taxonomy articles created by Polbot